X Factor is a Ukrainian television music competition to find new singing talent and part of a British franchise The X Factor. The ninth series began on 1 September 2018 and concluded on 29 December 2018. The judging panel remained the same from last series of Oleg Vinnik, Anastasia Kamenskykh, Dmytro Shurov and Andriy Danylko. Andrey Bednyakov returned as presenter of the main show on STB.

ZBSband won the competition and for the first time on the Ukrainian version of the x factor a group won the show and Anastasia Kamenskykh became the winning for the first time.

Selection process

Auditions

Judges' houses

Finalists
 – Winner
 – Runner-up
 – Third place

Live Shows

Results summary

Colour key

Live show details

Week 1 (24 November)

Week 2 (1 December)

Week 3 (8 December)

Week 4 (15 December)

Week 5 Semi-final (22 December)

Week 6 Final (29 December)

References

2018 Ukrainian television seasons